Elif Gülbayrak (born January 1, 1988 in Bursa) is a Turkish volleyball player. She is 185 cm tall. She has played for Fenerbahçe Acıbadem Team since 2007 season start and wears number 16. She played 14 times for the national team. She also played for Bursa Büyükşehir Belediyespor, Vakıfbank Güneş Sigorta and UPS.

See also
 Turkish women in sports

References

1988 births
Living people
Sportspeople from Bursa
Turkish women's volleyball players
Fenerbahçe volleyballers
VakıfBank S.K. volleyballers